The Slovak National Museum is the most important institution focusing on scientific research and cultural education in the field of museology in Slovakia. Its beginnings "are connected with the endeavour of the Slovak nation for national emancipation and self-determination".

It is headquartered in Bratislava, however, the Slovak National Museum governs 18 specialized museums, most of which are located outside the city.

History
The Slovak National Museum (SNM) was established in 1961. Its origins lie in the Matica Slovenská Museum and the Museum of the National House in Martin, which developed the Slovak Museology Society. The first permanent exposition funded from a national collection was opened in Martin in 1908. The museum was building archaeological, ethnographic, historical, numismatic, art historical, creative art and natural science collections. The Slovak National Geographic and History Museum was established in Bratislava in 1924 by the Slovak National Geographic and History Museum Society. The Agricultural Museum, a department of the Czechoslovak Agricultural Museum in Prague, was established in Bratislava the same year. In 1940, the Slovak National Geographic and History Museum and the Agricultural Museum were merged into the Slovak Museum. In 1961, the Slovak Museum and the Slovak National Museum in Martin were merged into the Slovak National Museum, based in Bratislava.

On March 11, 2012, the Krásna Hôrka Castle (part of the SNM), was damaged by a fire started when two children were lighting cigarettes. The fire destroyed the roof but most of the historic collections were undamaged. The castle is expected to reopen in 2018.

The museum today

The Slovak National Museum is the most important scientific research and cultural education institution, with the largest and best collections in the museological field in Slovakia. The museum is also dedicated to scientific research tasks and publishing activities. Moreover, the SNM is "a coordination, methodological, professional advisory, statistical, educational and information centre for the whole field of museology in the Slovak Republic."

Building
The Slovak National Museum's headquarters are located on Vajanské nábrežie (a river front street in Bratislava's Old Town), along with the Natural History Museum. The construction of the building, designed by architect M. M. Harminec, began in July 1925 and was completed in 1928. The museum opened on May 4, 1930.

Specialized museums and departments
{| class="wikitable sortable"
! width="22%" |Name
! width="20%" |Slovak name
! width="28%" |Location
|-
|Natural Science Museum
|Prírodovedné múzeum
|Bratislava
|-
|Archeological Museum
|Archeologické múzeum
|Bratislava
|-
|Museum of History
|Historické múzeum
|Bratislava Castle
|-
|Music Museum
|Hudobné múzeum
|Bratislava Castle
|-
|Ethnographic Museum
|Etnografické múzeum
|Martin
|-
|Andrej Kmeť Museum
|Múzeum Andreja Kmeťa
|Martin
|-
|Museum of Slovak Village
|Múzeum slovenskej dediny
|Martin
|-
|Martin Benka Museum
|Múzeum Martina Benku
|Martin
|-
|Museum of Czech Culture in Slovakia
|Múzeum kultúry Čechov na Slovensku
|Martin
|-
|Museum of Roma Culture in Slovakia
|Múzeum kultúry Rómov na Slovensku
|Martin
|-
|Karol Plicka Museum
|Múzeum Karola Plicku
|Blatnica (subdivision of Martin Museums)
|-
|Museum of the Slovak National Councils
|Múzeum Slovenských národných rád
|Myjava
|-
|Červený Kameň Museum
|Múzeum Červený Kameň
|Červený Kameň Castle
|-
|Betliar Museum
|Múzeum Betliar
|Betliar
|-
|Bojnice Museum
|Múzeum Bojnice
|Bojnice Castle
|-
|Spiš Museum in Levoča
|Spišské múzeum v Levoči
|Levoča
|-
|Museum of Puppet Culture and Toys
|Múzeum bábkarských kultúr a hračiek
|Modrý Kameň Castle
|-
|Museum of Jewish Culture
|Múzeum židovskej kultúry
|Bratislava, also on display in Trnava, Žilina and Prešov
|-
|Museum of Hungarian Culture in Slovakia
|Múzeum kultúry Maďarov na Slovensku
|Bratislava
|-
|Museum of Carpathian German Culture
|Múzeum kultúry karpatských Nemcov
|Bratislava
|-
|Museum of Ukrainian-Ruthenian Culture
|Múzeum ukrajinskej kultúry
|Svidník
|-
|Museum of Ruthenian Culture
|Múzeum rusínskej kultúry
|Prešov
|-
|Museum of Ľudovít Štúr
|Múzeum Ľudovíta Štúra
|Modra
|-
|Museum of Croatian Culture in Slovakia
|Múzeum kultúry Chorvátov na Slovensku
|Bratislava-Devínska Nová Ves
|-
|}

See also 

 List of music museums

References

External links

 National Museum official website 
 Slovak National Museum at Google Cultural Institute

Museums established in 1961
Museums in Bratislava
Archaeological museums
National museums
Natural history museums in Slovakia
History museums in Slovakia
Music museums
Music organisations based in Slovakia